The 1103 is a dynamic random-access memory (DRAM) integrated circuit (IC) developed and fabricated by Intel. Introduced in October 1970, the 1103 was the first commercially available DRAM IC; and due to its small physical size and low price relative to magnetic-core memory, it replaced the latter in many applications.  When it was introduced in 1970, initial production yields were poor, and it was not until the fifth stepping of the production masks that it became available in large quantities during 1971.

Development

In 1969 William Regitz and his colleagues at Honeywell invented a three-transistor dynamic memory cell and began to canvass the semiconductor industry for a producer.  The recently founded Intel Corporation responded and developed two very similar 1024-bit chips, the 1102 and 1103, under the lead of Joel Karp, working closely with William Regitz.  Ultimately only the 1103 went into production.

Microsystems International became the first second source for the 1103 in 1971. Later National Semiconductor, Signetics, and Synertek manufactured the 1103 as well.

Technical details

References 

1103
Computer-related introductions in 1970
Computer memory